The Department of Industrial Relations (also called DIR) was an Australian government department that existed between July 1987 and July 1997.

Scope
Information about the department's functions and/or government funding allocation could be found in the Administrative Arrangements Orders, the annual Portfolio Budget Statements and in the Department's annual reports.

At its creation, the Department was responsible for the following:
Industrial relations, including conciliation and arbitration in relation to industrial disputes; 
Promotion of sound industrial relations policies, practices and  machinery; 
Public Service pay and conditions, and; 
Remuneration Tribunals.

Structure
The Department was an Australian Public Service department, staffed by officials who were responsible to the Minister for Industrial Relations. The department's central office was located in Canberra, with regional offices in Sydney, Melbourne, Adelaide, Brisbane, Perth, Darwin and Tasmania.

References

Ministries established in 1987
Industrial Relations